Geneva Overholser is a journalism consultant and adviser.  A former editor of the Des Moines Register now living in New York City,  Overholser speaks and writes about the future of journalism. She advises numerous organizations, including the Trust Project, Report for America, SciLine, the Democracy Fund and the Public Face of Science project at the Academy of American Arts and Sciences. She serves on the boards of the Rita Allen Foundation, Northwestern University in Qatar and the CUNY Graduate School of Journalism Foundation.

She is a former senior fellow at the Democracy Fund. She was editor of the Des Moines Register when the paper won a Pulitzer Gold Medal for Public Service for a series on an Iowa woman who was raped. The woman's name and photographs were used in the story, sparking a national debate on the naming of rape victims.

Overholser was professor and director of the USC Annenberg School of Journalism from 2008 to 2013. She was the ombudsman for The Washington Post from 1995 to 1998 and then served as a columnist for the Washington Post Writers Group. From 1989 to 1997, she was a board member of the Pulitzer Prizes at the Columbia University Graduate School of Journalism, serving as chair in her final year.

As editor of The Des Moines Register newspaper from 1988 to 1995, she  earned the award of Gannett Editor of the Year in 1990, and was named Best in the Business by the American Journalism Review and Editor of the Year by the National Press Foundation.

Overholser held the Curtis B. Hurley Chair in Public Affairs Reporting in the Washington bureau of the University of Missouri School of Journalism from 2000 to 2008. She was a member of the editorial board of the New York Times from 1985 to 1988.

She is a former board member of the Women's Media Center, the Academy of American Poets, the Committee of Concerned Journalists, the Carnegie Endowment for International Peace, the Knight fellowships at Stanford and the American Society of Newspaper Editors, as well as the journalism advisory committees of the Knight Foundation and the Poynter Institute. She chaired the board of the Center for Public Integrity. She was a Nieman Fellow at Harvard, and is a fellow of the American Academy of Arts and Sciences, and of the Society of Professional Journalists.

She co-edited, with Kathleen Hall Jamieson, the book "The Press" in the Oxford series, Institutions of American Democracy.  She is the author of "On Behalf of Journalism: A Manifesto for Change."

Background 
She earned her undergraduate degree from Wellesley College in 1970, and a Masters of Science in Journalism from Northwestern University Medill School of Journalism  in 1971. She has received Alumnae Achievement Awards from Wellesley, Medill and Northwestern, as well as honorary doctorates from Grinnell College and St. Andrews College.

Overholser worked as a reporter for the Colorado Springs SUN from 1971 to 1974. She lived and worked overseas, in Kinshasa (then Zaire, now Congo) and in Paris, from 1974 to 1979. She is the sister of Nannerl Overholser Keohane, former president of Wellesley College and Duke University, and of Knowles Arthur Overholser, an associate dean of engineering at Vanderbilt University.

References

External links

American journalism academics
Wellesley College alumni
Medill School of Journalism alumni
The Washington Post journalists
University of Southern California faculty
Living people
The New York Times people
Year of birth missing (living people)